Since acceding to the throne of Sweden in 1973, Carl XVI Gustaf has made a number of state and official visits. He usually hosts one or two visiting heads of state each year.

State visits abroad

References

Foreign relations of Sweden
Carl Xvi Gustaf
Carl Xvi Gustaf
Carl Xvi Gustaf
State visits made by Carl XVI Gustaf
Carl XVI Gustaf